is a Japanese actress from Sendai, Miyagi Prefecture.

She graduated from Teikyo University Junior College Secretarial Department.

Appearances

TV dramas
1986
Shiro Tora-tai – as Yuki Mase

1987
Taikō-ki
Dokuganryū Masamune – as Yurihime
Announcer Puttsun Monogatari (CX)
Otoko-tachi ni yoroshiku (TBS)

1988
Ginga TV Shōsetsu Sōmubusōmuka Roppeita Yamaguchi (NHK) – as Sayoko Yoshizawa
Motto Abunai Deka Episode 11 "Kekkon" (16 Dec, NTV) – as Hakodate West Police Station detective Mayumi Enomoto*

1989
Kinyō SP Nihonhōsō Sakka Kyōkai 30 Shūnenkinen Mysterious Fantasy Pearl 1989-1970 (TBS)

1990
Aitsu ga Trouble Episode 7 "Bakudan kakaete Tsuppashire" (27 Jan, CX) – as Yuko Kitamura
Kayō Mystery Gekijō Akakabu Kenjifunsenki (ABC)
Abunai Onna-tachi (CX)

1991
Hitori de mite Ne Oppai ga Omotai!! (TBS)
Nananin no Onna Bengoshi (EX)
Asa no Renzoku Drama Hana Yūzen (YTV)
Saturday Night at the Mysteries Bijin Gekai Koroshi (EX) – as Ritsuko Kimura

1992
Getsuyō Onna no Suspense Joryū Sakka Series (Second Stage) Isho Futatsu (TX)
Inochimoyu (EX)
Drama City '92 Manatsu no Yoru no Yume Akai Honeymoon (YTV)
Oretachi Rookie Cop Episode 10 "Dai Funtō" (16 Jun, TBS)
Saturday Night at the Mysteries Edogawa Ranpo no Bijo Series: Karakuri Ningyō no Bijo (4 Jul, EX) – as Fumiyo Kobayashi
Aishino deka Episode 1 "Meikonbi Tanjō! Yūjō no Sōsa" (18 Oct, EX) – as Misako Noguchi
Ōshin Doctor Jiken Karute Episode 10 "Onna wa Dokyō de Strip" (24 Nov, EX)

1993
Nananin no Onna Bengoshi (EX)
Kinyō Drama Watashitte Busu dattano? (TBS)
Eiga mitaina Koi shitai Fuhō Shinnyū Episode 138 (TX)
Nikushimi ni Hohoende (TBS)
Otome no Mystery Chantoko no Giwaku (CX)

1994
Saturday Night at the Mysteries Edogawa Ranpo no Bijo Series: Midarana Mofuku no Bijo (8 Jan, EX) – as Fumiyo Kobayashi
Hanjuku Tamago Episodes 4, 7 (CX)
September Love Story (TBS)

1995
Shinshun Drama SP Totsukawa Keibu Series 7 "Gōka Tokkyū Twilight Satsujin Jiken" (2 Jan, TBS) – as Kuriko Hiroike
Kinyō Entertainment Joyū Midori Natsuki Series Hanayakana Jōtaijō (CX)
Gokenin Zankurō Episode 8 (CX)
Kayō Mystery Gekijō Shōkyōto Mystery 15 "Yamato-ji-kumi himo Satsujin Jiken" (26 Sep, NTV) – as Nami Hirose (Snack orchid mama)
Kaze no Keiji Tokyo Hatsu! Episode 5 "Kanzenhanzai no Onna!? Kinen Shashin no Nazo" (15 Nov, EX)

1996
Saturday Night at the Mysteries Kaseifu wa Mita! 15 "Zaikai Ichizoku no Kyoshoku no Arasoi Rōgai One-man Owner ni Muragaru Onna-tachi no Himitsu" (13 Apr, EX)
Shichisei Tōshin Guyferd (TX)
Weekend Drama Hen (EX)
Itazura na Kiss (EX) – as Seiko Izumi

1997
Saturday Night at the Mysteries Yakan Kenshō (EX) – as Satomi Yakushiji
Meitantei Hokenshitsu no Obasan (EX)
Kinyō Entertainment Kitchen Tantei Chinami Minamimoto no Suiri Nisshi (CX)
Face (CX)
Kinyō Entertainment Bijin Kisha Fuyuko Kosaka no Mei Suiri (CX)
Kinyō Entertainment Nurse na Tantei (CX) – as Kanako Aoki

1998
Ryakudatsu-ai Abu nai Onna (TBS)
Saturday Night at the Mysteries Misa Yamamura: Ai no Mashūko Satsujin Jiken (EX) – as Reiko Obayashi
Saturday Night at the Mysteries Onsen Waka okami no Satsujin Suiri (EX) – as Reiko Ogasawara
Getsuyō Drama Special Bridal Coordinator no Jiken-bo Nagoya Yometori Satsujin Jiken (TBS) – as Yuka Kanuma
Kinyō Entertainment Depart Girl Tantei (CX) – as Kaoru Asano

1999
Saturday Night at the Mysteries Diet Sanshimai no Ryojō Jiken-bo 3 (EX) – as Yumi Takada'
Omizu no Hanamichi Episodes 9, 10 (CX)
Getsuyō Drama Special Hostess Tantei Kikiippatsu (TBS) – as Ayako Asaoka
The Hangman Super 2000 (ABC)
The Doctor (TBS)
Kinyō Entertainment Jigoku no Hanayome 1 (CX) – as Motoko Izawa
Saturday Night at the Mysteries Shūchakueki –Yakō Ressha– (EX)

2000
Kyoto Sennyū Sōsa-kan Episode 9 (EX) – as Kiko Natsuhara

2001
Ai wa Seigi (EX) – as Etsuko Yashiro
Maria (TBS) – as Midori Oshima
Kinyō Entertainment Bi Esthe Tantei (CX) – as Yoko Kakuza
Muta Keiji-kan Jiken File 30 (EX) – as Yoshiko Miura
Shin-D: Ready Made Episodes 1, 2 (NTV) – as Naoko Ono
Onna to Ai to Mystery Ame no Tabi Kakunodate no Satsujin (TX) – as Otoyakko

2002
Onna to Ai to Mystery Zeikan Kensakan Yoko Imai Mitsuyu Diamond Satsujin Jiken (TX) – as Atsuko Esaka
Haruchan 6 Weeks 4, 5 (CX)
Onna to Ai to Mystery Jiken Kisha Shinsuke Uragami 2 Nagasaki Ijin Yakata no Shisen (TX) – as Otoyakko
Mokuyō Mystery Kasōken no Onna 4 Episode 3 "Yūrei-kan no Sangeki ni Hime rareta Wana" (8 Aug, EX) – as Chisato Hoshino

2003
Jikū Keisatsu 3 Prince Shōtoku (NTV)
Onna to Ai to Mystery Tokusō Keiji Reiko Toyama (TX)
Kayō Mystery Gekijō Yakatabune no Onna (NTV)
Saturday Night at the Mysteries Kenji Yoko Asahina (EX)

2004
Ai no Solea (CX)
Getsuyō Mystery Gekijō Gomi wa Koroshi o Shitteiru 6 (TBS)
Saturday Night at the Mysteries Kariya Chichi Musume Series 5 Kyoto Gionmatsuriri Satsujin Jiken (EX)
Sasori Zenpen (BS-TBS)
Getsuyō Mystery Gekijō Zaimu Sōsa-kan Ruriko Amamiya (TBS)

2005
Oniyome Nikki Episode 3 (CX)
Tabinokaori-ji no Asobi (EX)

2006
Koisuru Nichiyōbi: New Type Episode 13 (BS-TBS) – as Ryoko Aida
Jigoku Shōjo Episode 3 (NTV) – as Mari Toriumi
Getsuyō Mystery Gekijō Nekketsu Kāsan Jiken-bo 2 (TBS)
Saturday Night at the Mysteries Nemuru Hone (EX)
Rensa Kaidan: Episode (TVK, KBS)
Izumo no Okuni Episode 4 (NHK) – as Sakiko Konoe

2007
Saturday Night at the Mysteries Depart Shikake Hito! Tamami Tennōji no Satsujin Suiri 1 "Manbiki Jiken ni sShikuma reta Kiken na Wana! Renzoku Satsujin no Nazo… Bijin Hanbai-in no Kyōgaku no Kako to Jittai o Abake!!" (15 Sep, EX) – as Ryoko Masuoka

2008
Tonari no Kramer (CX)
Kinyō Prestige Tsugarukaikyō Mystery Kōro (7) – Satomi Yoshikawa
Hisho no Kagami (TX) – as Chiyo Nanbara
Kinyō Prestige Hakui no Tenshi wa Mita Geka Byōtō Satsujin Karute (CX)

2009
Saturday Night at the Mysteries Okashina Keiji 5 Inemuri Keiji to Elite Onna Keishi Niigata Tōkamachi Kimono Show ni Chichi Musume Sennyū Sōsa! Nerawareta Butaikami no Jigen Hassha Trick! (28 Mar, EX) – as Megumi Nakahara
Suiyō Mystery 9 Mikkai no Yado 7 (1 Jul, TX) – as Hitomi Negishi

2010
Getsuyō Golden Bengoshi Rinko Ichinose 2 (18 Jan, TBS)

2011
Getsuyō Golden Midorikawa Keibu VS Satsujin Trump (12 Sep, TBS) – as Akemi Hoshino
Getsuyō Golden Keishichō Minamidaira Han –Shichinin no Keiji– 4 (7 Nov, TBS) – as Yuri Hatano

2013
Kinyō Prestige Totsugawakeiji no Shōzō 7 (CX) – as Harumi Wakatsuki

2014
Maruho no Onna –Hoken Hanzai Chōsa-in– Episode 8 (6 Jun, TX) – as Kazuko Tateishi

2015
Aka to Kuro no Gekijō Obasan Bengoshi Tamako Machida (30 Jan, CX) – as Kanae Yuki
Saturday Night at the Mysteries Hanzai Shinri-gaku Kyōju Mamoru Kanesaka no Sōsa File 2 (11 Jul, ABC) – as Satomi Maeda

2016
Suiyō Mystery 9 Mother Kyōkō Han-gakari no Onna –Hata Kiki– (20 Apr, TX) – as Azusa Sawai

Films
Akane sasu Heya
Mayonaka no Shōjo-tachi–Sentimental Highway
Zenshin to Koyubi
Memories of Matsuko
Chikyū no Miryoku – as Kyoko Yasuda
Ikusa Dai Ni-sen –Nihonmatsu no Tora–
Dennō Keiji matsuri–Deka-bushi
L'amant
Shūchakueki no Tsugi no Eki
Kindan no Jiken-bo Stalker o Aishita Onna
Tomato Juice
Suicide Manual 2 –Chūkyū-hen–
Seventh Anniversary
Salaryman Kintarō
Futei no Kisetsu
Yowamushi Chinpira
Bara Hotel
Higurashi When They Cry
Body Jack (2008) – as Reiko Sawai
Tenohira no Shōsetsu (2010) Episode 2 "Thank You" – as Yasuko

To be determined
Ai no Note
Kanjō Kyōiku
Kuraitokorode Machi Awase

Direct-to-video
Kyō-jū no Kiba – as Akiko Kamiyama
Bakusō Tracker Gundan Part 2
Die Hard Angels –Kiken o Aisuru Onna-tachi–
Yonimo Kimyōna Monogatari–Bud Girl

Internet
Kashima-C (Jun 2006–)
–Keiji matsuri– Deka-bushi

Stage
Mutekina Otokotachi
Hanshin Daishinsai
Nekonohige no shikumi
Seikimatsu Sanninshimai
My Sweet Baby
Shujinkō wa Omae janai

DVD/video
1shot 2love Hashire Camera kozō!!
Renai Hakusho
The Hangman Super 2000

Photo albums
Fandango (14 Sep 1999, Bauhaus)
Blue Forest (2 Mar 1995, Schola)

Advertisements
Taisho Pharmaceutical Co. Prisa Ace
Toyota Mark X Short Movie "Hashiri Tsuzukeru Otoko" (BS Nittele only, as Misako)

References

External links
 – Staff-up 

Japanese actresses
Japanese female adult models
People from Sendai
1966 births
Living people